Fuentelapeña is a municipality located in the province of Zamora, Castile and León, Spain. According to the 2009 census (INE), the municipality has a population of 858 inhabitants.

An annual tradition in Fuentelapena is the fire-branding of the new cattle – consisting of the ranch's identifying mark, the number "6", and the number of cows held by that ranch that year.

References

Municipalities of the Province of Zamora